EJ Onu (born July 31, 1999) is an American professional basketball player for the Santa Cruz Warriors of the NBA G League. He played college basketball for the Shawnee State Bears.

Early life and high school career
Born to Nigerian parents, Ejiofor Onu grew up near Cleveland, Ohio. He started playing basketball at age 14 and stood under  as a high school freshman. Onu played for Richmond Heights High School in Richmond Heights, Ohio, earning Division IV All-Northeast Lake District honors from the Associated Press. He also ran track in high school.

College career
During his freshman season at Shawnee State, Onu set a program single-game record with 11 blocks against the University of the Cumberlands. As a freshman, he averaged 9.4 points, 5.2 rebounds and a nation-leading 3.4 blocks per game, earning Mid-South Conference (MSC) Defensive Player of the Year and Freshman of the Year honors. He set a program single-season record for blocks. In his sophomore season, he averaged 12 points, 6.5 rebounds and 3.1 blocks per game. Onu was selected to the Second Team All-MSC. 

As a junior, Onu averaged 11.7 points, 7.8 rebounds and a nation-leading 5.7 blocks per game. He was an Honorable Mention National Association of Intercollegiate Athletics (NAIA) All-American, First Team All-MSC and MSC Defensive Player of the Year. As a senior, Onu averaged 16.9 points, 8.1 rebounds and 4.5 blocks per game, earning First Team NAIA All-American, MSC Player of the Year and First Team All-MSC honors. For a third time, he was named MSC Defensive Player of the Year and led the nation in blocks. Onu became Shawnee State's all-time leader in blocks while ranking third in points and rebounds. He helped his team win an NAIA national championship. After the season, Onu declared for the 2021 NBA draft while maintaining his college eligibility and entering the transfer portal. On July 6, 2021, he announced that he was remaining in the draft.

Professional career

Texas Legends (2021–2022)
After going undrafted in the 2021 NBA draft, Onu joined the Dallas Mavericks for the NBA Summer League. On August 21, 2021, the  Mavericks announced that they had signed Onu, but was waived by the on September 4. He returned to Dallas on October 15, 2021, but was waived a day later. On October 23, he signed with the Texas Legends as an affiliate player. Onu was then later waived by the Legends on January 13, 2022.

Memphis Hustle (2022)
On January 14, 2022, Onu was acquired via available player pool by the Memphis Hustle. In 25 games, he averaged 5.96 points and 3.72 rebounds.

Niagara River Lions (2022)
On April 5, 2022, Onu signed with the Niagara River Lions of the Canadian Elite Basketball League. He was named the CEBL Defensive Player of the Year after averaging a league record 3.3 blocks per game, establishing Niagara as one of the best defensive teams in the league.

Return to Memphis (2022–2023)
Onu joined the Memphis Grizzlies for the 2022 NBA Summer League. On November 4, 2022, Onu was named to the opening night roster for the Memphis Hustle.

Santa Cruz Warriors (2023–present)
On January 22, 2023, Onu was traded to the Santa Cruz Warriors in exchange for Tremont Waters.

Career statistics

College

|-
| style="text-align:left;"| 2017–18
| style="text-align:left;"| Shawnee State
| 30 || 30 || – || .517 || .256 || .723 || 5.2 || .4 || .2 || 3.4 || 9.4
|-
| style="text-align:left;"| 2018–19
| style="text-align:left;"| Shawnee State
| 30 || 29 || – || .570 || .346 || .728 || 6.5 || .2 || .2 || 3.1 || 12.0
|-
| style="text-align:left;"| 2019–20
| style="text-align:left;"| Shawnee State
| 32 || 32 || 30.7 || .451 || .270 || .679 || 7.8 || .4 || .3 || 5.7 || 11.7
|-
| style="text-align:left;"| 2020–21
| style="text-align:left;"| Shawnee State
| 33 || 33 || 29.6 || .573 || .400 || .748 || 8.1 || .5 || .7 || 4.5 || 16.9
|- class="sortbottom"
| style="text-align:center;" colspan="2"| Career
| 125 || 124 || – || .528 || .330 || .721 || 6.9 || .4 || .3 || 4.2 || 12.6

References

External links
Shawnee State Bears bio

1999 births
Living people
American expatriate basketball people in Canada
American men's basketball players
American sportspeople of Nigerian descent
Basketball players from Cleveland
Centers (basketball)
College men's basketball players in the United States
Memphis Hustle players
Niagara River Lions players
Power forwards (basketball)
Santa Cruz Warriors players
Shawnee State University alumni
Texas Legends players